Nannostomus mortenthaleri, commonly known as the coral red pencilfish, is a freshwater species of fish  belonging to the  characin family Lebiasinidae. It is one of the most colourful of the genus, being suffused with a bright coral red colouration over its entire body and fins, in striking contrast to its horizontal jet black stripes. It was originally described as a subspecies of Nannostomus marginatus, but it is now recognised as a species in its own right. Mature males have a thickened anal fin. Maximum length is 29mm.

The fish is named in honor of aquarium-fish exporter Martin Mortenthaler (1961-2018), the owner of Aquarium Rio Momon SRL in Iquitos, Peru, who collected the type specimen.

Distribution
Its distribution is fairly restricted to date; it has only been recorded from a small tributary of the Nanay River, and possibly the Tigre River, Peru.

References

Lebiasinidae
Fish described in 2001
Fish of Peru
Endemic fauna of Peru